Teres III was a king of the Odrysians in Thrace in  149 BC, the son of Cotys IV.

References

See also
 List of Thracian tribes
 
2nd-century BC rulers in Europe
Thracian kings